Nuru may refer to:

People
Nuru Awadhi Bafadhili (born 1952), Tanzanian politician
Nuru Bayramov, surgeon and academic
Nuru Kane, Senegalese singer
Sara Nuru (born 1989), German fashion model of Ethiopian descent
Mohammed Nuru, American former civil servant

Places
Nuru, Silifke, a village in Mersin Province, Turkey
Qara Nuru, a village in Saatly District, Azerbaijan

Other uses
Nuru (massage), a type of erotic massage
Nuru Energy, a Rwanda-based company
Nuru International, an NGO working in Kenya and Ethiopia
Nuru River, in Papua New Guinea